Potato is a 1987 South Korean remake of a 1967 film with the same name, and the second adaptation of Kim Dong-in's short novel.

Plot
Bok-nyeo is forced to marry a widower who is older than she is. After the marriage, she goes to work at a salt farm, where she is raped by her boss. Bok-nyeo decides to make money by changing her lifestyle. Later, she falls in love with a Chinese herbalist in Korea, Mr. Wang. Bok-nyeo becomes jealous when Mr. Wang gets married. She tries to kill Wang, but Mr. Wang kills Bok-nyeo and hides her body.

Cast
Kang Soo-yeon  as Bok-nyeo
Kim In-moon 
Lee Dae-keun  as Mr. Wang
Kim Hyeong-ja  as Durene
Choe In-suk 
Cho Ju-mi

References

External links 
 
 

South Korean drama films
1987 films
Remakes of South Korean films
Films set in the Joseon dynasty
Films about rape
Films based on Korean novels
Films directed by Byun Jang-ho